Luo Xiaojuan (born 19 March 1993) is a Chinese freestyle wrestler. She won one of the bronze medals in the 62kg event at the 2022 World Wrestling Championships held in Belgrade, Serbia. She is a two-time gold medalist at the Asian Wrestling Championships.

In 2015, she won the gold medal in the women's 60 kg event at the Asian Wrestling Championships held in Doha, Qatar. She repeated this in the women's 65 kg event at the 2019 Asian Wrestling Championships held in Xi'an, China. She also won the silver medal in the women's 62 kg event at the 2018 Asian Wrestling Championships held in Bishkek, Kyrgyzstan.

She won the silver medal in her event at the 2023 Ibrahim Moustafa Tournament held in Alexandria, Egypt.

References

External links 
 

Living people
1993 births
Place of birth missing (living people)
Chinese female sport wrestlers
Asian Wrestling Championships medalists
World Wrestling Championships medalists
21st-century Chinese women